Clarisse Andriamampandry Ratsifandrihamanana (Fénérive-Est, December 5, 1926 – Antananarivo, June 28, 1987) was a Malagasy writer.

She married Dr. Henri Ratsifandrihamanana in 1946, and they had eight children, including Lila Ratsifandrihamanana. She gained seven important literature prizes and was a member of Malagasy Academy and an officer of Legion of Honour. Clarisse Ratsifandrihamanana had started writing when she was very young, but she really devoted herself to literature after her third daughter's death in 1950. Her literature style is very diverse, both in themes and formats.

Partial bibliography
 Ny Zanako, I, II
 Lavakombarika
 Salohy
 Ramose
 Lohataona sy Rririnina

External links
  Biography

1926 births
1987 deaths
Malagasy women writers
20th-century women writers
20th-century writers
Officiers of the Légion d'honneur
People from Analanjirofo

Malagasy-language writers